Energy in Syria is mostly oil and gas. Some energy infrastructure was damaged by the Syrian civil war.

Overview

Electricity

Pre-2011 
In the 2000s, Syria's electric power system struggled to meet the growing demands presented by an increasingly energy-hungry society. Demand grew by roughly 7.5% per year during this decade, fueled by the expansion of Syria's industrial and service sectors, the spread of energy-intensive home appliances, and state policies (i.e. high subsidies and low tariffs) that encouraged wasteful energy practices. Syria's inefficient transmission infrastructure compounded these problems: In 2002, Electricity Minister Munib Saem al-Daher stated that 26% of the country's total electricity production was wasted in transmission, amounting to USD 57.7 billion in losses. These factors together resulted in increasingly frequent power cuts, which in turn fueled public frustration.

Throughout this period, the Syrian government sought to close the supply gap by investing in new electricity generation infrastructure. Investments moved away from oil-powered infrastructure and toward gas-fueled power plants, reflecting Syria's declining domestic oil production, improved access to natural gas, and the superior efficiency of gas-fed combined cycle power plants. New investments relied significantly on international technical expertise to execute projects, notably by the German firm Siemens, but also by firms hailing from Iran, India, and elsewhere. They also relied on international financing, including from the European Investment Bank and the Arab Fund for Economic and Social Development.

Wartime disruption 
Syria's conflict wrought havoc on the country's electricity system, leading to increasingly frequent blackouts across the country, disruptions to all forms of economic activity, and reports that electrical fires increased due to problems with the electrical grid.

Infrastructural damage 
Swathes of Syria's generation and transmission infrastructure were damaged or destroyed, due to a combination of bombardment by Syrian government forces, aerial attacks by the US-led international military intervention against the Islamic State, attacks by insurgent groups, and looting by armed factions. Between 2015 and 2017, violence and looting destroyed three major power plants, namely the Aleppo Thermal Station, Zayzoon in Idlib, and al-Taim in Deir Ezzor. Pre-war, these three plants had accounted for almost one-fifth of Syria's total generation capacity. In 2021, Syria's Ministry of Electricity estimated total losses to the electricity sector at USD 2.4 billion.

Resource scarcity 
In addition to infrastructural damage, war also left Syria with acute shortages of the fuel and water needed to power Syria's thermal and hydroelectric infrastructure. On one side, the Syrian government's loss of major oil and gas fields first to the Islamic State and then to the Autonomous Administration of North and East Syria contributed to extreme fuel scarcity and thus a reliance on imports, notably from Iran. On the other, rising temperatures, diminished rainfall, and Turkish restrictions on the flow of the Euphrates River brought the latter's water levels to a crisis point, thus threatening the capacity of the three dams located along the Euphrates in Syria: namely the Tabqa Dam, Baath Dam, and Tishrin Dam.

Expertise scarcity 
Pre-2011, Syria relied heavily on foreign expertise to spearhead the most complex forms of investment in Syria's electrical sector, including repairing and installing generation infrastructure. After a decade of war, the combination of western sanctions and foreign exchange shortages had created major obstacles to bringing in foreign expertise. To make matters worse, Syria's own pool of homegrown technical competence was reduced by a relentless brain drain and devastating setbacks to the country's education sector.

Sanctions 
US and EU sanctions further undermined Syria's electricity sector, including by barring foreign (i.e. European and Arab) entities from extending loans or implementing infrastructure projects and by straining Syria's ability to import fuel and spare parts.

Oil
According to BBC oil accounts for ca. 25% of Syria's income, estimated as $3.2bn for 2010. EU members account for ca. 95% of oil exports. According to BBC oil reserves were 2.5bn barrels in 2010.

Business
The Syrian Petroleum Company (SPC) is a state-owned oil company established in 1974.

See also

References